Rainer Kraft (born 30 July 1962 in Stuttgart) is a German football coach who works as coach for Accra Lions FC. He used to be assistant coach of Esteghlal in the Iran Pro League with fellow countryman Erich Rutemöller.

References

German football managers
Living people
1962 births
Stuttgarter Kickers managers
3. Liga managers
1. FC Normannia Gmünd managers
Sportspeople from Stuttgart